The Regensburg University of Applied Sciences (literally: Eastern Bavarian Technical University of Regensburg) is a university in Regensburg, Germany. It was founded in 1971 as a college for technology, business and social work, but has roots in the mid 19th century. Today the university is one of the largest institutions of applied sciences in Bavaria. Its eight faculties offer 28 Bachelor's degree programs, 20 Master's degree studies as well as five postgraduate courses. Emphasis is laid on Engineering and Computer Sciences, and Law, Economic and Social Sciences.

History

Beginnings
The history of Regensburg University of Applied Sciences goes back to the middle of 19th century, when the private drawing teacher Johann Dörner founded a private school for construction and plan drawing in 1846. In 1868 this school was united with the "Königlich Bayerische Realschule, Regensburg" to offer education in the construction trades, beyond regular school education. In 1953 it was transformed and renamed into the so-called "Bauschule für Hoch- und Tiefbau".

Birth of Johannes-Kepler-Polytechnikum
Because of the rising numbers of students in Regensburg, the government of Oberpfalz decided to expand the educational offers of the Bauschule in Regensburg. As a result of this the faculties of mechanical engineering and electrical engineering were founded in 1958 and named after the famous German mathematician Johannes Kepler, with the institution taking on the name Johannes-Kepler-Polytechnikum

Foundation of the Fachhochschule Regensburg 

In 1964 the responsibility for the Johannes-Kepler-Polytechnikum was passed from the government of Oberpfalz to the state government of Bavaria. The government of Bavaria decided in 1971 to create a new type of university, the model of Fachhochschule. In this process the Johannes-Kepler-Polytechnikum was merged with some smaller schools for business and engineering near Regensburg, and the Fachhochschule Regensburg was founded in its modern form. As a result of this additional studies could be offered and classes in business studies, computer sciences and social sciences were added to the catalogue.

The Fachhochschule Regensburg was renamed Regensburg University of Applied Sciences in 2013. It remains the only university of applied sciences in Bavaria which offers mathematics as a major course.

Academic Collaborations
 North China Institute of Aerospace Engineering, China
 Qingdao University of Science and Technology. China
 Qingdao Technological University, China
 University of Shanghai for Science and Technology, China
 Universiti Tunku Abdul Rahman, Malaysia - Collaborate to offer Master of Engineering (Electronic Systems)
 Universiti Sains Malaysia, Malaysia
 University of Hong Kong, Hong Kong
 Chaoyang University of Technology, Taiwan
 National Polytechnic (Ecole National Polytechnique de Constantine, ENPC), Algeria

Rankings
According to the Center for Higher Education (CHE), an initiative co-led by Bertelsmann Stiftung and German Rectors' Conference, the university is ranked as a leading university of applied sciences in Germany. Especially the Faculties of Computer Science and Mathematics (Top 1 in Germany), mechanical and civil engineering (Top 10 in Germany) as well as the Faculty of business administration (Top 20 in Germany) performed strongly.

See also
 Fachhochschule
 Hochschule

References

External links
 Official Website of the University

Universities and colleges in Bavaria
Universities of Applied Sciences in Germany
Educational institutions established in 1971
Regensburg
Technical universities and colleges in Germany